Waikele is a census-designated place (CDP) in Honolulu County, Hawaii, United States. As of the 2020 census, the CDP population was 7,509. Residents use Waipahu, Hawaii for their postal city.

Geography
Waikele is located at  (21.4025524, -158.0058055).

Demographics

Education
Hawaii Department of Education operates public schools. Waikele Elementary School is in Waikele CDP.

References

Census-designated places in Honolulu County, Hawaii